John Abercrombie / Marc Johnson / Peter Erskine is a live album by jazz guitarist John Abercrombie with bassist Marc Johnson and drummer Peter Erskine that was recorded in 1988 in Boston and released by ECM Records in 1989.

Reception
The Allmusic review by Ron Wynn gave the album 4½ stars, stating, "The trio sometimes unite for piercing interpretations as on "Stella By Starlight" and other times collide and interact on furious rhythm dialogues and extended improvisations". The Penguin Guide to Jazz said, "Not known as a big standards player Abercrombie turns in a beautiful "Stella by Starlight" here, perfectly weighted this side of sentimentality, and an unforgettable version of the less well-known Dietz/Schwatrz "Haunted Heart". Johnson and Erskine make a convincing team"

Track listing

Personnel
 John Abercrombie – guitar, guitar synthesizer
 Marc Johnson – double bass
 Peter Erskine – drums

References

ECM Records albums
John Abercrombie (guitarist) albums
1989 albums
Albums produced by Manfred Eicher